James Garland Quintel  is an American animator, voice actor, director, writer, producer, and storyboard artist. He is best known as the creator of the Cartoon Network series Regular Show (2010–2017), in which he voiced Mordecai and High Five Ghost, and the HBO Max series Close Enough (2020–2022), in which he voices Josh.

Quintel was formerly the creative director for The Marvelous Misadventures of Flapjack (2008–2010), which aired on Cartoon Network, and a writer and storyboard artist on Camp Lazlo (2006–2008). In 2009, he was nominated for the Annie Award for Directing in a Television Production for directing an episode of Flapjack. In 2011, he was nominated for the Emmy Award for Outstanding Short-format Animated Program category for Regular Show.

Early life and education 
James Garland Quintel was born in Hanford, California the son of Terri (née Morris) and James Allen Quintel. According to Quintel, Hanford's geography is "kind of flat" and there "was not a ton to do" when he was growing up, so he and his friends were always looking for ways to entertain themselves; he later incorporated these kinds of misadventures into Regular Show. He was inspired by animators Matt Groening, Mike Judge, and Joe Murray, later working for the latter. Into his teenage years, he loved drawing and watching cartoons such as The Simpsons, Beavis and Butt-Head, Rocko's Modern Life, and The Ren & Stimpy Show, as well as British surreal comedy shows such as The League of Gentlemen, The Office, and The Mighty Boosh, which would later inspire Quintel's work.

Quintel often played the video game ToeJam & Earl, the influence of which he later described as "the perfect platform" for Regular Show protagonists Mordecai and Rigby. He also became influenced by rock music from the 1980s and later added 1980s music into Regular Show. He attended Hanford High School. In 1998, when he was 16, his father gave him a video camera which he used (along with Lego men and crude paper cutouts) to create a few minutes of stop motion film for several short film projects at Hanford High School. To expand his artistry, he took an AP literature class and a pottery class at Hanford High, as well as a summer class where he learned how to animate films and make flip books. He also worked at a movie theater and at "a lot of minimum wage jobs", just as Mordecai and Rigby work for minimum wage at a park in Regular Show. In May 2000, he was nominated as a 12th grade California academic all-star from Hanford High.

After high school, Quintel attended the California Institute of the Arts in Santa Clarita, California. At CalArts, Quintel and about 20 fellow students, including now-voice artist Sam Marin, developed their short films by throwing title names (such as "lollypop" or "candy") into a hat, drawing them out, and reading them aloud at midnight as a warm-up, where they would each then rush back to their desks in a marathon effort to make a film in 48 hours based on the one word drawn. In the spring of 2005, this CalArts process led Quintel to put together a short animated film about an ambassador who loses his cool during a benign encounter. Quintel titled his new film The Naive Man from Lolliland. Moreover, as Quintel's first exposure to the animation industry, Quintel obtained a 2004 internship at Cartoon Network Studios to work on the TV series Star Wars: Clone Wars. At CalArts, Quintel would also meet another student by the name of Pendleton Ward, with whom he would later work with on the Cartoon Network series The Marvelous Misadventures of Flapjack. Ward would later use his experience from Flapjack to go on to create the Emmy Award-winning Cartoon Network series Adventure Time.

During the fall of Quintel's fourth year at CalArts, The Naive Man from Lolliland won both the Producers Choice Award (an Apple G5 computer and a copy of Bauhaus Software's Mirage animation software) and the Student Animator Award (US$1,000 and a copy of Softimage XSI 3D computer graphics software) at the 2005 Nextoons Nicktoons Film Festival. In response to Quintel's success at the 2005 Nicktoons Film Festival, Fred Seibert, an entertainment entrepreneur and television and film producer, identified Quintel as "an original talent to watch out for in the future". Quintel's hometown local newspaper, the Hanford Sentinel, noted Quintel's success at the 2005 Nicktoons Film Festival as being one of 2005's moments from a memorable year. In December 2005, Quintel graduated from the California Institute of the Arts with a BFA degree in character animation.

Career
After graduating Quintel passed a test and began working as a storyboard revisionist for Cartoon Network's Camp Lazlo. In May 2006, Nicktoons Network announced that Quintel would be one of six judges at the 3rd Annual Nicktoons Network Animation Festival. In 2007, Quintel entered his short film, 2 in the AM PM, in the 30th annual Spike & Mike's Sick and Twisted Festival of Animation. In 2 in the AM PM, two slackers are left alone to run a convenience store/gas station on Halloween night, where candy filled with drugs creates a mini-nightmare. Quintel later used some of these 2 in the AM PM characters in Regular Show.

In 2008, Quintel pitched Regular Show for the Cartoonstitute project at Cartoon Network by using a storyboard, with his reasoning that "I don't think me verbally pitching such an odd concept would have made any sense to anyone." In 2009, Cartoon Network ordered more episodes of The Marvelous Misadventures of Flapjack as well as greenlit Quintel's project, Regular Show. The agreement upon the premise of Regular Show was that the series would be about two park groundskeepers, Mordecai (a 6-foot blue jay) and Rigby (a hyperactive raccoon), who try to entertain themselves at their jobs while doing anything they can to avoid work and escape their everyday boredom. Along with his success at getting approval to develop Regular Show, in December 2009, Quintel and director John Infantino were nominated for an ASIFA-Hollywood Annie Award in the category of "Directing in a Television Production" for their directing work on the Candy Casanova episode in Season 2 of The Marvelous Misadventures of Flapjack. However, American animation director and fellow CalArts graduate Bret Haaland subsequently took the director Annie Award in February 2010 for Haaland's work on The Penguins of Madagascar – Launchtime. Nine months after Quintel was nominated for an Annie Award, Regular Show debuted at 8:15 P.M. EST on September 6, 2010. In September 2011, while the first season of Regular Show was being aired, Quintel was nominated for a Primetime Emmy Award in the Outstanding Short-format Animated Program category as executive producer and creator of Regular Show. However, his Regular Show series was beat out for the award by the ABC animated special, Disney Prep & Landing: Operation Secret Santa.

By March 2012, Quintel was directing a crew of about 35 to develop each episode of Regular Show, which takes about nine months to go from idea to final product. Quintel has most recently worked for Cartoon Network Studios in Burbank, California developing episodes for Regular Show and provided his real voice to the 23-year-old blue jay Regular Show character Mordecai. In commenting on his voice acting, Quintel noted how he has an easy-going nature and never yells in real life, so he had to learn how to yell as the Mordecai character.

Following Regular Show conclusion in January 2017, Quintel announced the creation of Close Enough, an adult animated series about a young couple and their daughter in Los Angeles. The series was initially expected to premiere later in 2017 as part of a planned adult animation block on TBS. However, the cornerstone of that block was a Louis C.K.-helmed series called The Cops, and when C.K. admitted to sexual misconduct earlier that summer TBS re-tooled their entire schedule, shunting Close Enough into development hell despite having its entire first season produced. It was later resurrected when TBS' parent company WarnerMedia Entertainment announced the launch of a streaming service, HBO Max, that would feature original exclusive content.

Personal life
Quintel married Cassia Streb in 2010.

Filmography

Film

Television

Awards and nominations

References

External links

 

Regular Show
American animated film directors
American animated film producers
Animators from California
American television writers
American male television writers
American male voice actors
American storyboard artists
American surrealist artists
Showrunners
Cartoon Network Studios people
Creative directors
California Institute of the Arts alumni
Living people
People from Hanford, California
Male actors from Los Angeles
Writers from Los Angeles
Primetime Emmy Award winners
Screenwriters from California
American people of Portuguese descent
Year of birth missing (living people)
21st-century American screenwriters
21st-century American male writers
21st-century American male actors